South Portsmouth–South Shore station is an Amtrak intercity rail station in South Shore, Kentucky. It primarily serves the city of Portsmouth, Ohio, located across the Ohio River. 

In pre-Amtrak years several C&O trains served a different station in Portsmouth: Fast Flying Virginian (west to Cincinnati, and sections east to Washington, D.C. and Newport News), George Washington (sections west to Cincinnati and Louisville, and sections east to Washington, D.C. and Newport News) and the Sportsman (northwest to Detroit, and sections east to Washington, D.C. and Newport News). Norfolk & Western trains called at another station in Portsmouth: Pocahantas (Cincinnati and Columbus - Norfolk) and Powhatan Arrow (Cincinnati - Norfolk). 

The station was opened as a flag stop for the James Whitcomb Riley and Mountaineer on June 15, 1976. Service to the stop was suspended on April 29, 1979, but resumed on April 27, 1980. In January 2011, the station was made accessible (with a wheelchair lift) using American Recovery and Reinvestment Act funding.

References

External links

South Portsmouth-South Shore Amtrak Station (USA Rail Guide -- Train Web)
South Shore (SPM)--Great American Stations (Amtrak)

Amtrak stations in Kentucky
Transportation buildings and structures in Greenup County, Kentucky
Stations along Chesapeake and Ohio Railway lines